Pursuit may refer to:

Arts and entertainment

Films 

 Pursuit (1935 film), a 1935 American action film
 Pursuit (1972 American film), a made-for-TV film directed by Michael Crichton
 Pursuit (1972 Hong Kong film), a Shaw Brothers film
 Pursuit (1989 film), a TV miniseries directed by Ian Sharp
 The pursuit of happyness, a 2006 Gabriel Muccino film
 Pursuit (2015 film), an Irish film
 Pursuit (2022 film), an American film
 Apache Blood or Pursuit, a 1975 film directed by Vern Piehl

Music 
 Pursuit (album), 2012 album by Stuck in the Sound
 The Pursuit (album), a 2009 album by Jamie Cullum
 "Pursuit", a 2010 song by In Fear and Faith from the album, Imperial

Television
 "Pursuit" (Death Note episode), 2006 episode of the anime series
 Pursuit (TV series), a 1950s anthology

Novel and games
 Pursuit (novel), a science fiction novel
 Pursuit (video game), a 1975 Atari game
Trivial Pursuit, a board game

Sports
 Individual pursuit, a biathlon event
Individual pursuit, a track cycling event
 Pursuit racing, where two or more competitors/teams are chasing after each other or a lead competitor/team
 Team pursuit, an event in long track speed skating
Team pursuit, a track cycling event

Vehicles
 Pontiac Pursuit or Chevrolet Cobalt, an automobile
 Pursuit aircraft, the US term for a fighter aircraft until the 1940s
 Rans S-11 Pursuit, a light aircraft

See also
 
 Chase (disambiguation)
 Deadly Pursuit (disambiguation)